The surname le Blanc, LeBlanc or Leblanc may refer to:

A 
 Abel LeBlanc (born c. 1936), Canadian politician
 Abraham LeBlanc (1840–1913), Canadian merchant and political figure 
 Adrian Nicole LeBlanc, American journalist
 Alfred LeBlanc (1869–1921), French aviator
 André LeBlanc (artist) (1921–1998), Haitian comic artist
 André LeBlanc (DC Comics), fictional jewelry thief in DC Comics
 Angela LeBlanc, Canadian writer and freelance literary reviewer, also known as Angela Narth
 Annie LeBlanc (born 1992), Canadian middle-distance runner
 Anthony LeBlanc, Canadian sports executive
 Antoine le Blanc (died 1833), American murderer
 Armand LeBlanc (1921-2004), American politician 
 Arthur LeBlanc (born 1943), the 33rd and current Lieutenant Governor of Nova Scotia
 Azor LeBlanc (1927-2011), Canadian business owner and political figure

B 
 Bart le Blanc (born 1946), Dutch economist
 Benjamin Amedeé LeBlanc (1879–1946), Canadian physician and political figure
 Bernard LeBlanc (born 1949), Canadian politician
 Bertin LeBlanc (born 1945), Canadian politician
 Bertrand LeBlanc, Canadian politician
 Bob LeBlanc (born 1962), American football player

C 
 Carl LeBlanc (born 1955), American guitarist and banjo player
 Cassandra Beth "Casey" LeBlanc (born 1987), Canadian recording artist
 Charles Leblanc (born 1996), Canadian baseball player
 Christian LeBlanc (born 1958), American actor
 Clarence White (born Clarence Joseph LeBlanc; 1944–1973), American bluegrass and country guitarist and singer
 Claude le Blanc (1669-1728), French royal official

D 
 Daniel LeBlanc (disambiguation), several people
 Daniel Wallace LeBlanc (1930–2013), American lawyer and jurist
 Deborah LeBlanc, American horror author
 Diana Fowler LeBlanc (born 1940), widow of Romeo LeBlanc
 Dominic LeBlanc (born 1967), Canadian politician
 Drew LeBlanc (born 1989), American ice hockey player
 Dudley J. LeBlanc (1894–1971), Louisiana state senator and the developer of Hadacol
 Dylan LeBlanc (born 1990), American singer

E 
 Edward Oliver LeBlanc (1923-2004), Dominican politician
 Evée LeBlanc (1878–1978), Canadian fishing captain

F 
 Francis LeBlanc (born 1953), member of the House of Commons of Canada from 1988 to 1997
 Fred S. LeBlanc, Louisiana attorney general and mayor of Baton Rouge

G 
 Gaston Thomas LeBlanc (1941–1980), Canadian politician
 George H. LeBlanc, the former mayor of Moncton, New Brunswick, Canada
 Guillaume LeBlanc (born 1962), Canadian former athlete who mainly competed in the 20 kilometre walk
 Guy LeBlanc (born 1960), Canadian keyboardist, member of rock bands Nathan Mahl and Camel 
 Guy Joseph LeBlanc (born 1950), Canadian politician
 Győző Leblanc (born 1947), Hungarian tenor opera singer, actor and director

H 
 Hélène LeBlanc (born 1958), Canadian politician
 Henry S. LeBlanc (1865–1946), Canadian merchant and political figure
 Hubert Le Blanc (flourished 1740s), French viol player

I 
 Isidore LeBlanc (born 1836), Acadian politician, ship owner and merchant

J 
 Jacob LeBlanc (born 1981), American former professional soccer player
 Jacques LeBlanc (born 1964), Canadian former boxer
 James LeBlanc, American actor
 Janique LeBlanc, Canadian curler
 Jean-Bernard, abbé Le Blanc (1707–1787), French art critic
 Jean-Paul LeBlanc (born 1946), Canadian former professional ice hockey player
 Jean-Paul LeBlanc (politician) (born 1923), Canadian former politician
 Jean-Marie Leblanc (born 1944), French cyclist and director of the Tour de France
 Jeanne Leblanc (born 1978), Canadian film director and screenwriter
 Jeff LeBlanc (born 1986), American independent singer and songwriter
 Jimmie LeBlanc (born 1977), Canadian composer and guitarist
 Jean (John) B. LeBlanc (born 1939), Canadian former jockey in Thoroughbred horse racing
 John LeBlanc (born 1964), Canadian former professional ice hockey left winger
 Judith M. LeBlanc (born 1936), American psychologist, teacher and special education researcher
 Jules LeBlanc (born 2004), American YouTuber, actress, singer, model, and internet personality
 Julius LeBlanc Stewart (1855–1919), American artist

K 
 Karen LeBlanc, Canadian film, television and musical theatre actress
 Karina LeBlanc (born 1980), Canadian soccer goalkeeper
 Keith LeBlanc, American drummer and record producer
 Ken Leblanc (disambiguation), several people

L 
 Larry LeBlanc, music journalist
 Lenny LeBlanc (born 1951), American musician and songwriter
 Leo LeBlanc (1939–1995), American musician
 Lisa LeBlanc (born 1990), Canadian singer-songwriter
 Louis César de La Baume Le Blanc (1708-1780), French nobleman
 Louis Guy LeBlanc (1921–1990), Liberal party member of the House of Commons of Canada
 Louis Jean Joseph Leblanc (born 1991), Canadian retired professional ice hockey centre
 Louise Profeit-LeBlanc (born 1951), Aboriginal storyteller
 Lucie Leblanc (born 1962), Canadian politician

M 
 Marc LeBlanc, educator about and designer of video games
 Marie-Angélique Memmie Le Blanc (1712–1775), French feral child
 Mario LeBlanc (born 1977), Acadian musician, known under his stage name Fayo
 Marlon LeBlanc (born 1976), American soccer coach
 Matt LeBlanc (born 1967), American actor, known for playing Joey Tribbiani in the sitcom Friends and Joey, and himself in Episodes
 Maurice Leblanc (1857–1923) French engineer and industrialist
 Maurice Leblanc (1864–1941), French novelist
 Maurice Le Blanc-Smith (1896–1986), British World War I flying ace 
 Michael LeBlanc (born 1987), Canadian track athlete specializing in the 100 metres
 Michel Leblanc (ice hockey) (born 1959), French ice hockey player
 Monique LeBlanc, Canadian politician
 Moreland le Blanc (born 1989), Sint Maarten cricketer

N 
 Neil LeBlanc (born 1956), Canadian politician
 Nicolas Leblanc (1742–1806), French chemist and surgeon
 Nicole M. LeBlanc, head milliner of Fleur de Paris in New Orleans

O 
 Olivier J. Leblanc (1830–1919), Canadian politician of Acadian descent
 Ovide Le Blanc (1801–1870), Canadian notary and politician

P 
 Paul LeBlanc (make-up artist), make-up artist who won an Oscar for Amadeus
 Paul LeBlanc (college president), current president of Southern New Hampshire University
 Paul Le Blanc (historian) (born 1947), American historian
 Peter LeBlanc (born 1988), Canadian professional ice hockey forward
 Peter LeBlanc (born  1938), Canadian chartered accountant and former political figure
 Philibert LeBlanc (1890–1964), Canadian politician
 Pierre LeBlanc (c. 1720 – 1799), Acadian pioneer and co-founder of Pointe-de-l'Église

R 
 Richard LeBlanc (born 1958), American Democratic member of the Michigan State House of Representatives
 Richard LeBlanc (born 1955), Canadian politician, also known as Cy LeBlanc
 Rita Benson LeBlanc (born 1977), Vice Chairman of the Board of the New Orleans Saints of the National Football League
 Roméo LeBlanc (1927–2009), Canadian Governor General

S 
 Samuel A. LeBlanc I (1886–1955), Louisiana politician and judge 
 Stanley le Blanc Smith (1849-1922), English rower
 Steven A. LeBlanc (born 1943), American archaeologist, author
 Suzie LeBlanc (born 1961), Canadian soprano and early music specialist

W 
 Wade LeBlanc (born 1984), American baseball pitcher

French-language surnames